Pulmonaria officinalis, common names lungwort, common lungwort, Mary's tears or Our Lady's milk drops, is a herbaceous rhizomatous evergreen perennial  plant of the genus Pulmonaria, belonging to the family Boraginaceae.

Etymology
The genus name comes from the Latin pulmo meaning lung and was first used by Leonhart Fuchs (1501–1566), a German physician and one of the three founding fathers of botany. The species was named officinalis by Carl Linnaeus for the medical properties of these plants, used since the Middle Ages to treat coughs and diseases of the chest, because of the doctrine of signatures whereby Christian doctors believed that plants that resemble any body part could be used to treat illnesses in this part since God put his signature in the plant to guide mankind.

Description

The basal leaves are green, cordate, more or less elongated and pointed and always with rounded and often sharply defined white or pale green patches. The upper surface of the leaves has tiny bumps and it is quite hairy. The leaves of this host plant are eaten by the caterpillars of the moth Ethmia pusiella. In spring, the plant produces small bunches of flowers. The 5-petal flowers are red or pink at first, later turn to blue-purple during the anthesis, by changing the pH value inside of the petals. As a matter of fact the flowers contain a dye that belongs to the anthocyanins and change the color from red (acidic) to blue (alkaline). Pulmonaria officinalis is diploid and has the chromosome number 2n = 14. Flowering period extends from March through May and the seeds ripen from May to June. Pollination is granted by insects (entomophily) - mainly bees, bumblebees and butterflies - the spread of seeds over ants.

Distribution
This native species is perhaps the most widespread plant in Europe. It is distributed west in the Ardennes up to the Netherlands, Denmark and southern Sweden. It is missing in Norway and it is only naturalized in the British Isles. It reaches central Russia and the Caucasus and it occurs in the Balkans and in northern to central Italy.

Habitat
Pulmonaria officinalis is an understorey species. It grows in deciduous and beech mixed forests from the lowlands to the mountains. It prefers fresh and shady areas, nutrient-rich and mostly calcareous, stony or pure clay loam soils, at an altitude of 0–1,500 meters (0–4,921 ft) above sea level. As a spring geophyte it starts its vegetative period before full foliation of the tree storey. During this time, it is exposed to high solar radiation, which presents a potential danger for the plant. After leaf out, the amount of solar radiation decreases. The plant is adapted to changing conditions with efficient protective and repair mechanisms (morphological characteristics of leaves, epidermal structure, UV-B absorbing substances). After foliation, the amount of photosynthetic pigments in plant leaves slightly increases due to less daylight available. On the contrary, the UV-B absorbing substances (flavonoids and anthocyanins) are significantly reduced after foliation.

Gallery

References

  
 Pignatti S. - Flora d'Italia – Edagricole – 1982, Vol. II, pag. 407
 Tutin, T.G. et al. - Flora Europaea, second edition - 1993

External links
 Biolib
 Pulmonaria officinalis

officinalis
Plants described in 1753
Taxa named by Carl Linnaeus